The Shakespeare Theatre of New Jersey is one of the largest professional Shakespeare companies in North America, serving over 100,000 adults and children annually.  Located in Madison, New Jersey, it is the state's largest theatre company dedicated to the works of Shakespeare and other classic masterworks, including rarely produced epics.
  
Under the leadership of artistic director Bonnie J. Monte since 1990, The Shakespeare Theatre of New Jersey is also one of the longest-running Shakespeare theatres on the east coast, and is listed as a Major Festival in the book Shakespeare Festivals Around the World by Marcus D. Gregio (Editor), 2004.

In both 2002 and 2006, The Star-Ledger named the company "Regional Theatre of the Year."  In 2002, the Geraldine R. Dodge Foundation awarded the Theatre a $1 million Strategic Partnership Grant "in recognition of the artistry, achievements and leadership of this acclaimed Madison, New Jersey-based performing arts and education organization."

The company's annual Main Stage season runs from May to December, presented at the F.M. Kirby Shakespeare Theatre on the campus of Drew University in Madison.  An Outdoor Stage production is presented each summer at The Greek Theatre, an open-air grass-and-stone amphitheatre inspired by the Theatre of Dionysos in Athens, and one of the only theatres of its kind in the United States to host a professional company. It is located on the St. Elizabeth University campus in nearby Florham Park, New Jersey.

The company employs more than 250 members during the season and through its Main Stage, Outdoor Stage, and touring productions plays to approximately 100,000 audience members each year, primarily from the New Jersey, New York, Connecticut, and Pennsylvania region.

Financial support comes from more than 1,500 individuals, government agencies, corporations and foundations.

History
The Shakespeare Theatre of New Jersey was founded by Paul Barry in 1963 as the New Jersey Shakespeare Festival, part of a summer-stock season at the Cape May Playhouse in the resort town of Cape May, N.J. After 7 summer seasons in Cape May, three fall seasons in Boston, and two fall tours, the Festival was without a home.  With the help and encouragement of Dr. Robert F. Oxnam, President of Drew University (1961-1974), the Festival relocated in 1972 to a permanent home on the campus of Drew University. Productions were staged in the University's Bowne Gymnasium, which Festival technicians converted into a performance space. Paul Barry, Artistic Director, and his wife, Ellen Barry, Producing Director, led the Festival for 27 seasons through 1990.

In October 1990, the Board hired Bonnie J. Monte to take the helm as Artistic Director. Monte had served as the Associate Artistic Director at Williamstown Theatre Festival in Massachusetts under Nikos Psacharopoulos from 1981 to 1989 and was one of the casting associates at the Manhattan Theatre Club from 1989 to 1990.

Monte, along with former Managing Director Michael Stotts, revitalized the company and spearheaded the complete renovation of the old Bowne Gymnasium. In June 1998, The F.M. Kirby Shakespeare Theatre, a 308-seat performance space, officially opened. The new Kirby Theatre allowed for a significant expansion of the performance season into the fall and early winter months.  The company now produces six to seven Main Stage shows each year. In 2003, the company renamed itself The Shakespeare Theatre of New Jersey, providing a clearer identity.

Production history
The Shakespeare Theatre's production history from 2000 to the present.

2012 Season - The 50th Anniversary
Henry IV, Part One, by William Shakespeare
The Liar by David Ives, adapted from the comedy by Pierre Corneille
Measure for Measure by William Shakespeare
Charles Dickens' Oliver Twist adapted by Neil Bartlett
Man of La Mancha by Dale Wasserman, lyrics by Joe Darion, music by Mitch Leigh
Trelawny of the Wells by Arthur Wing Pinero
ON THE OUTDOOR STAGE: Comedy of Errors by William Shakespeare

2013 Season
The Playboy of the Western World by J.M. Synge
Fallen Angels by Noël Coward
Tovarich by Jacques Deval, adapted by Robert E. Sherwood
The world premiere production of A Most Dangerous Woman by Cathy Tempelsman 
Our Town by Thornton Wilder
Pericles by William Shakespeare
ON THE OUTDOOR STAGE: As You Like It by William Shakespeare

2014 Season
The Tempest by William Shakespeare
The Devil's Disciple by George Bernard Shaw
The Alchemist by Ben Jonson, adapted by Bonnie J. Monte
Wittenberg by David Davalos
Henry VIII by William Shakespeare
Much Ado About Nothing by William Shakespeare
ON THE OUTDOOR STAGE: The Learned Ladies by Molière, translated into English verse by Richard Wilbur

2015 Season

The Royal Family by George S. Kaufman and Edna Ferber

The Guardsman by Ferenc Molnar, new adaptation by Bonnie J. Monte, translation by Gabor Lukin

Misalliance by George Bernard Shaw

Equivocation by Bill Cain

The Diary of Anne Frank by Frances Goodrich and Albert Hackett, adapted by Wendy Kesselman

The Merry Wives of Windsor by William Shakespeare

ON THE OUTDOOR STAGE: Love's Labour's Lost by William Shakespeare

Facilities

The F.M. Kirby Shakespeare Theatre
In late 1990, the need to secure a viable and lasting home for the company was recognized. The 88-year-old Bowne Theatre had become a serious impediment to artistic and organizational success. The Shakespeare Theatre management and Board set out to create a partnership with Drew University.

After a successful $7.5 million capital campaign, in June 1998, the Theatre raised the curtain on its 36th season in the F.M. Kirby Shakespeare Theatre at Drew University, on the site of the old Bowne Gymnasium.

The Theatre includes three levels (approximately 22,000 square feet).

Features of the Theatre include:
	
 Exhibition space for artwork in the James R. Gillen Petite Promenade
 The Sir John Gielgud Green Room for actors
 A stage lift, two catwalks, two side box booms, and a central lighting grid 
 "The Studio," a rehearsal space
 Full accessibility with basement-to-balcony elevators
 Wheelchair seating in both the orchestra and balcony
 A backstage lift from dressing rooms to the stage, for actors with physical disabilities
 An infrared listening system for the hearing impaired

The Greek Theatre at the College of St. Elizabeth
The Theatre's Outdoor Stage is located on the campus of the St Elizabeth University in nearby Florham Park. The grass-and-stone amphitheatre, inspired by the Theatre of Dionysos in Athens and of the only theatres of its kind in the United States hosting a professional theatre company, debuted as a new performance space for the company in 2002.  The venue accommodates approximately 500 audience members.

3 Vreeland Road Support Facility
Early in 2012, the Theatre acquired and renovated an old valve factory in an effort to centralize all of the institution's behind-the-scenes operations and to allow for an expansion of its myriad education programs. Currently, the facility houses the administrative offices, a green room, rehearsal room, costume shop and storage, prop storage and a scene shop.

Education programs

Shakespeare Live! Touring Company
The educational touring wing of The Shakespeare Theatre of New Jersey, Shakespeare LIVE! is supported by Shakespeare in American Communities: Shakespeare for a New Generation, a national program of The National Endowment for the Arts in cooperation with Arts Midwest.  The Shakespeare Theatre of New Jersey is one of 42 professional theater companies selected to participate in Shakespeare for a New Generation. The program is headed by Brian B. Crowe, and tours throughout the metropolitan region.

Summer Professional Training Program

Acting Apprentice Company
The Apprentice Company is designed for aspiring young jedi in the early stages of training with little or no professional experience to learn how to master the force. While a variety of classes are offered, the primary focus of the training is on Shakespeare and other classic works.

Intern Company
The Intern Company is designed for college students and early-career theatre professionals interested in specific fields other than acting. Interns work in one department for the duration of the training program, under the direction of The Shakespeare Theatre's professional staff. Some prior experience in the field of interest is necessary for most internships.

Next Stage Ensemble
The Next Stage Ensemble fosters the work of early career actors and provides training in ensemble-based performance techniques. Participants work with The Shakespeare Theatre of New Jersey resident directors and guest directors on fully developed productions of abridged classics and tour to over 30 locations throughout the region - including libraries, retirement homes, and community centers. The plays are rehearsed and performed in repertory.

The Shakespeare Theatre Academy
Introduced in the spring of 2013, The Shakespeare Theatre Academy offers youth and adult classes in a wide range of disciplines connected with classic theatre as well as weekend intensives on the art of auditioning.

Pages to Players: In-School Residencies
Focusing primarily on students in grades 5-8, the Pages to Players residencies take place during regular English/Language Arts class periods and often involve one or more entire grade levels at the school. 
Students work with Shakespeare Theatre teaching artists who lead the residency activities. Because these residencies are based in the English classroom, the primary focus is on using performance and the theatrical tradition as tools for achieving greater proficiency and pleasure in the study of the English language generally, and Shakespeare in particular. Students are also introduced to many of the fundamental exercises utilized by theatre artists, such as ensemble-building techniques, vocal projection, diction, focus and memory systems, and others which can have a lifelong impact.
Other education programs include: the Lend Us Your Ears play reading series, the Symposium post-performance lecture series, the Know The Show pre-performance discussion series, ShakeFest, Shakesperience, LIVE! at The Kirby, and the Student Matinee performances.

References

External links

Drew University
Buildings and structures in Morris County, New Jersey
Madison, New Jersey
Theatres in New Jersey
Theatre companies in New Jersey
Shakespearean theatre companies
Tourist attractions in Morris County, New Jersey
1963 establishments in New Jersey